The year 2006 is the tenth year in the history of M-1 Global, a mixed martial arts promotion based in Russia. In 2006 M-1 Global held 6 events beginning with, M-1 MFC: Mix Fight.

Events list

M-1 MFC: Mix Fight

M-1 MFC: Mix Fight was an event held on February 18, 2006, in Saint Petersburg, Russia.

Results

M-1 MFC: Russia vs. Europe

M-1 MFC: Russia vs. Europe was an event held on April 8, 2006, in Saint Petersburg, Russia.

Results

M-1 MFC: Mix-Fight

M-1 MFC: Mix-Fight was an event held on June 15, 2006, in Russia.

Results

M-1 MFC: Mix-Fight

M-1 MFC: Mix-Fight was an event held on October 7, 2006, in Russia.

Results

M-1: Mix-Fight Tournament

M-1: Mix-Fight Tournament was an event held on October 12, 2006, in Russia.

Results

M-1: International Fight Night 6

M-1: International Fight Night 6 was an event held on November 18, 2006, in Saint Petersburg, Russia.

Results

References

M-1 Global events
2006 in mixed martial arts